"So Bad" (stylized in all caps) is the debut single released by South Korean girl group STAYC. Co-written and produced by Black Eyed Pilseung, the song was released on November 12, 2020, as the lead single from the group's debut single album Star to a Young Culture. A remix of the song titled "So Bad (Tak Remix)" was released on January 10, 2021. The remix was later included on the group's second single album Staydom.

Lyrics and composition
The song has a genre that combines drum and bass with synth-wave. Described as a whirlwind of retro synth arpeggios, distinct vocal tones, staccato verses, a hyper rhythm that keeps things moving and aglow with glistening synth arpeggio and sprightly drum-and-bass, the song expresses feelings of someone who really likes the person who has stolen their heart, and hopes that person will accept her feelings.

Music video
The music video for the song was released on the same day and the song and amassed over 2.6 million views in its first 24 hours of upload. The video was directed by Minjun Lee and Hayoung Lee.

Plagiarism accusation 
On November 16, 2020, Korean netizens noticed that aspects of the "So Bad" music video appeared similar to the "Midnight Sky" video by Miley Cyrus. A few days after the accusations, Legend Film, the music video production company, issued an apology.

Commercial performance 
The song debuted at number 90 on Billboard's K-pop Hot 100 later peaking at number 82, and number 21 on the World Digital Song Sales chart. The song also entered the Korean Gaon Digital Chart peaking at number 159.

Live performance
To promote the song and the album, STAYC performed "So Bad" and B-side "Like This" through a VLIVE debut showcase. The group made their music show debut on November 13, 2020, at KBS Music Bank, and then at Show Champion, Inkigayo, and The Show.

Track listing
Download and streaming
 "So Bad" – 3:32
Streaming (Tak Remix)
 "So Bad (Tak Remix)" – 3:05

Accolades

Awards and nominations

Year end lists

Charts

Release history

References

2020 debut singles
2020 songs
Song recordings produced by Black Eyed Pilseung
Kakao M singles
STAYC songs